Pisces, Aquarius, Capricorn & Jones Ltd. is the fourth album by the Monkees. It was released on November 6, 1967, during a period when the band exerted more control over their music and performed many of the instruments themselves (previously forbidden by Colgems). However, although the group had complete artistic control over the procceedings, they invited more outside contributions than on their previous album, Headquarters, and used session musicians to complement their sound. The album also featured one of the first uses of the Moog synthesizer in popular music. Pisces, Aquarius, Capricorn & Jones Ltd. sold over three million copies. It was the band's fourth consecutive album to reach No. 1 on the U.S. Billboard 200.

History

The group employed studio musicians to a greater extent than their previous album, Headquarters. The greater reliance on studio musicians was a result of the band's busy filming schedule for their popular sitcom. The album's single, "Pleasant Valley Sunday" b/w "Words", was a hit, peaking at No. 3 on the Billboard Hot 100.

The album was among the earliest to make use of the Moog synthesizer, which Dolenz introduced to the group and played in the studio; he owned one of the first twenty ever sold. Along with the Doors' September 1967 album Strange Days, Their Satanic Majesties Request by the Rolling Stones in December, and the Byrds' January 1968 album The Notorious Byrd Brothers, Pisces was one of the first commercial recordings to reach a wide audience featuring the Moog. Dolenz played the synthesizer on "Daily Nightly", while electronic musician Paul Beaver played it on "Star Collector".

Two additional songs, "Daydream Believer" and "Goin' Down", were recorded during the album sessions. Released on 7-inch vinyl in October 1967, it was the group's last  single.

The album's title stems from each band member's respective astrological sign: Dolenz is Pisces, Peter Tork is Aquarius, and both Nesmith and Davy Jones are Capricorn.

The album's cover features a drawing of the four Monkees by Bernard Yeszin, their facial features blank, standing in a field of flowers, with the group's guitar logo half-buried.

In 2007, Rhino issued a two-disc deluxe edition of the album. The CD set featured original album artwork, including replicas of the original Colgems vinyl labels on each disc, as well as a booklet of essays and session information by Monkees historian Andrew Sandoval. The discs contain remastered mixes of both the stereo and mono releases of the album, as well as alternate mixes and outtakes.

Track listing

Original 1967 Colgems vinyl issue

Side 1

Side 2

Aborted track listing

The original track lineup for the album, compiled on October 9, 1967, included the following songs:

Side 1

 "Special Announcement"
 "She Hangs Out"
 "Salesman"
 "Cuddly Toy"
 "Words"
 "Don't Call on Me"
 "Goin' Down"

Side 2

 "The Door Into Summer"
 "Hard to Believe"
 "What Am I Doing Hangin' 'Round?"
 "Daily Nightly"
 "Peter Percival Patterson's Pet Pig Porky"
 "Pleasant Valley Sunday"
 "Star Collector"

1995 Rhino CD reissue

Tracks 1–13: Original album in stereo

1996 Sundazed vinyl reissue

 Blue colored LP contains bonus track at the end of Side 1 only: "Goin' Down" (Prev. unissued alternate mix)

2007 Rhino deluxe CD reissue

Disc one

Tracks 1–13: Original album in stereo

Disc two

Tracks 1–13: Original album in mono

Personnel
The Monkees

 Micky Dolenz – vocals; drums ("Cuddly Toy" and "The Door into Summer"); Moog synthesizer ("Daily Nightly"); possible acoustic guitar ("Pleasant Valley Sunday")
 Davy Jones – vocals; percussion ("The Door into Summer", "Love Is Only Sleeping", "Cuddly Toy", "Words" and "Don't Call on Me")
 Michael Nesmith – vocals; guitar; percussion ("Salesman" and "Words")
 Peter Tork – vocals; keyboards; possible acoustic guitar ("Salesman")

Production staff and session musicians

 Chip Douglas – vocals; producer; bass guitar, guitar ("Salesman", "The Door into Summer" and "Don't Call on Me")
Hank Cicalo – engineer
Lester Sill – music supervision
 Eddie Hoh – drums, percussion
 Bill Chadwick – acoustic guitar ("Pleasant Valley Sunday")
 Kim Capli – guitar, bass, piano, drums and percussion on "Hard To Believe"
 Douglas Dillard – electric banjo ("What Am I Doing Hangin' 'Round?")
 Paul Beaver – Moog synthesizer ("Star Collector")
 Bob Rafelson – piano ("Don't Call on Me")
 Unknown – percussion ("She Hangs Out")

Arrangers 

 Shorty Rogers – arrangement ("She Hangs Out")
 Roger Farris – arrangement ("Hard To Believe")
 George Tipton – orchestrator ("Hard To Believe")

Brass and strings 

 Pete Candoli, Robert Helfer, Al Porcino and Manuel Stevens – trumpet ("She Hangs Out")
 Richard Leith, Richard Noel and Philip Teele – trombone ("She Hangs Out" )
 Oliver Mitchell and Anthony Terran – trumpet ("Hard To Believe")
 Robert Knight – bass trombone ("Hard To Believe")
 Vincent DeRosa – French horn ("Hard To Believe")
 Jim Horn – baritone sax ("Hard To Believe")
 Leonard Atkins, Arnold Belnick, Nathan Kaproff, Wilbert Nuttycombe, Jerome Reisler and Darrel Terwilliger – violin ("Hard To Believe")
 Edgar Lustgarten – cello ("Cuddly Toy")

Others 

 Ted Nash, Tom Scott, Bud Shank – wind instruments ("Cuddly Toy")

Session information 
"Salesman"
 Written by Craig Vincent Smith
 Lead vocal by Michael Nesmith
 Backing vocals: Micky Dolenz, Davy Jones
 Electric guitar: Michael Nesmith
 Bass: Chip Douglas
 Nylon-string guitar: Chip Douglas
 Acoustic guitar: Peter Tork
 Drums: Eddie Hoh
 Shaker: Michael Nesmith
 Craig Vincent Smith was a friend of Nesmith's who later appeared in the band Penny Arkade, which Nesmith produced
 Featured on the TV show in the episode "The Devil and Peter Tork" and caused controversy when NBC objected to the episode, citing the song and its veiled drug reference in the third verse. The song refers to the adventure of a travelling salesman.
 Recorded at RCA Victor Studio A, Hollywood, June 14, 1967

"She Hangs Out"
 Written by Jeff Barry
 Lead vocal by Davy Jones
 Backing vocals: Micky Dolenz, Davy Jones
 Electric guitar: Michael Nesmith, and Unknown
 Bass: Chip Douglas
 Drums: Eddie Hoh
 Organ: Peter Tork
 Percussion: Unknown
 Trumpet: Pete Candoli, Robert Helfer, Al Porcino, Manuel Stevens
 Bass Trombone: Richard Leith, Philip Teele
 Trombone: Richard Noel
 Arrangement: Shorty Rogers
 Used on episode #41 ("The Card Carrying Red Shoes"), without the horns (the hornless master remains lost, but available on Remastered, Deluxe Edition – "Alternate Stereo Mix")
 This was a remake of the January 1967 cut that Don Kirshner released without authorization in Canada; the release helped lead to Kirshner's firing from Colgems records.
 The original mono mix features a longer fade than on the stereo mix.
 Used in the episodes "Card Carrying Red Shoes" and "Some Like It Lukewarm"
 While Jeff Barry is officially credited as the writer of the song, several sites and sources claim Ellie Greenwich to have co-written the track.
 Recorded at RCA Victor Studio B, New York City, July 21, 1967

"The Door into Summer"
 Written by Chip Douglas and Bill Martin
 Lead vocal by Michael Nesmith
 Harmony vocal: Micky Dolenz
 Backing vocal: Harry Nilsson
 Guitar: Michael Nesmith, Chip Douglas 
 Bass: Chip Douglas
 Drums: Micky Dolenz, Eddie Hoh
 Percussion: Davy Jones
 Keyboards: Peter Tork
 Banjo: Douglas Dillard
 Unknown: Bill Martin
 The title is from a novel by sci-fi author Robert Heinlein.
 Eddie Hoh is credited with drumming, but some evidence exists that the first take featured Micky on drums. Close listening to the finished recording reveals that there are two separate drum tracks. The right channel features drumming which continues through the entire track. At the start of the second verse, another drum track begins in the left channel and continues through the rest of the song.
 Used in the episodes "Monkees on the Wheel" and "Some Like It Lukewarm"
 The song was officially written by Bill Martin and Chip Douglas, though the latter denies any writing contribution.
 An early unused mono mix released on the deluxe edition contained different vocals.
 Recorded at RCA Victor Studios, Hollywood, May 29 and August 23, 1967

"Love Is Only Sleeping"
 Written by Barry Mann and Cynthia Weil
 Lead vocal by Michael Nesmith
 Harmony vocals: Micky Dolenz
 Backing vocals: Davy Jones
 Electric guitar: Michael Nesmith
 Acoustic guitar: Chip Douglas
 Bass: Chip Douglas
 Drums: Eddie Hoh
 Organ: Peter Tork
 Percussion: Davy Jones
 Sound Effects: Bill Chadwick
 Unknown: Bill Martin, Harry Nilsson
 Not originally intended to be included on Pisces, Aquarius, Capricorn & Jones Ltd. as the song was to be issued as a single instead
 After a manufacturing error caused some delays, Colgems rethought the strategy and released the more commercial "Daydream Believer" as the single instead, with "Goin' Down" as its B-side
 The song was featured on three episodes of the TV show—"Everywhere a Sheik, Sheik", "I Was A 99-pound Weakling", and "The Monkees In Paris." The Paris episode features the song's released mix while the first two episodes feature a more stripped-down version derived from the song's original four-track mix before it was transferred to eight-track magnetic tape for additional mixing.This song was the first song by Nesmith after his surgery in 1967.
 Recorded at RCA Victor Studios, Hollywood, June 19 and August 1967

"Cuddly Toy"
 Written by Harry Nilsson
 Lead vocal by Davy Jones
 Harmony vocals: Micky Dolenz
 Backing vocals: Micky Dolenz, Davy Jones, Peter Tork 
 Acoustic & electric guitars: Michael Nesmith
 Bass: Chip Douglas
 Drums: Micky Dolenz
 Tambourine: Davy Jones
 Piano: Peter Tork
 Electric Piano: Peter Tork
 Cello: Edgar Lustgarten
 Wind: Ted Nash, Tom Scott, Bud Shank
 This song and "The Door Into Summer" are the only songs featuring Micky behind the drums on the album
 Demo was under the name "By Any Boy"
 Selected by the band after Nilsson auditioned several songs for the group
 Some have interpreted the lyrics as being about a gang bang. In the liner notes to the CD's 1995 release it is stated that supervisor Lester Sill was angered to discover this.
 Used in the episodes "Everywhere a Sheik, Sheik", and "I Was a 99-Pound Weakling"
 The mix presented here does not have a fade, while appearances on compilation albums do.
 Recorded at RCA Victor Studios, Hollywood, April 26, 1967

"Words"
 Written by Tommy Boyce and Bobby Hart
 Lead vocals by Micky Dolenz and Peter Tork
 Backing vocals: Davy Jones, Michael Nesmith
 Electric guitar: Michael Nesmith
 Bass: Peter Tork is credited by Andrew Sandoval in the accompanying 'liner notes' booklet for the Monkees'1991 Boxed Set, 'Listen to the Band'. Sandoval is on record as having had retrieved Musician's Union files in Los Angeles so as to provide specific & thorough details of Monkees' recording sessions, including all session dates and all musicians. Chip Douglas is frequently listed as bass player for this track, but in interviews hasn't confirmed his playing on this song.
 Drums: Eddie Hoh
 Percussion: Michael Nesmith
 Chimes: Davy Jones
 Tree: Davy Jones
 Hammond B-3 Organ: Peter Tork
 Originally recorded for More of The Monkees in August 1966, but re-recorded for this album under the group's direction
 In the music video, Tork plays the guitar, Nesmith plays the bass, Jones plays the drums and Dolenz sings and plays the tambourine. The band said that this lineup is what The Monkees should have been, as these instrument choices best represented the individual members' strengths (Nesmith believed Tork was a better guitarist than he, while Nesmith himself was particularly accomplished as a bass guitarist. Jones was the only member of The Monkees who already knew how to play the drums). But, Nesmith played the guitar and Tork played the organ, Jones played the chimes, with Chip Douglas playing bass and "Fast" Eddie Hoh on the drums.
 Reached number 11 on the pop charts
 This version used in summer 1967 rebroadcast of the episodes "Monkees in a Ghost Town" and "Monkees Chow Mein"; then used in the second-season episodes "Monkees in Texas" and "Monkees' Paw" while the original version was used in the episode "Monkees in Manhattan"
 The single mix is not the album mix. Dolenz says "ah" twice on the single mix.
 Recorded at RCA Victor Studio A, Hollywood, June 14, 1967

"Hard To Believe"
 Written by David Jones, Kim Capli, Eddie Brick and Charlie Rockett
 Lead vocal by Davy Jones
Backing vocals by Davy Jones and Micky Dolenz
 Guitar: Kim Capli
 Bass: Kim Capli
 Drums: Kim Capli
 Percussion: Kim Capli
 Piano: Kim Capli
 Violin: Leonard Atkins, Arnold Belnick, Nathan Kaproff, Wilbert Nuttycombe, Jerome Reisler, Darrel Terwilliger
 Flugelhorn: Oliver Mitchell, Anthony Terran
 French horn: Vincent DeRosa
 Baritone saxophone: Jim Horn
 Bass trombone: Robert Knight
 Shaker: Kim Capli
 Claves: Kim Capli
 Cowbell: Kim Capli
 Orchestrator: George Tipton
 Arrangement: Roger Farris
 This was the last new composition to be recorded that would make the album. It is also the only track apart from "Peter Percival Patterson's Pet Pig Porky" to feature a single Monkee, and the only track that features session musicians exclusively on instruments.
 This is the only song from the original album not used on the TV show.
 Recorded at RCA Victor Studios, Hollywood, August 23, 1967

"What Am I Doing Hangin' 'Round?"
 Written under the pseudonyms Travis Lewis and Boomer Clark, but actually the work of Michael Martin Murphey and Owens Castleman
 Lead vocal by Michael Nesmith
 Backing vocals: Micky Dolenz, Davy Jones
 Electric guitar: Michael Nesmith
 Bass: Chip Douglas
 Drums: Eddie Hoh
 Electric banjo: Douglas Dillard
 Chosen by Nesmith for the country feel it gave off; Murphey was an old friend of Nesmith
 The released mix features group vocals, but an early mix featured only a double-tracked vocal by Nesmith.
 Used in the episodes "It's a Nice Place To Visit...", "Monkees Marooned", and "The Monkees Race Again". The mix included in "Monkees Marooned" had a slightly longer run time, owing to the song's chorus being repeated four times after the last verse, instead of three times.
 Recorded at RCA Victor Studios, Hollywood, June 20, 1967

"Peter Percival Patterson's Pet Pig Porky"
 Written by Peter Tork
 Spoken words by Peter Tork
 Taught to Peter by Judy Mayhan, whom he was managing at the time.
 Peter admits that it was public domain, but when Screen Gems asked who wrote it he gave his name (which he could do, as 'arranger' of the piece)
 Recorded at RCA Victor Studios, Hollywood, June 10, 1967

"Pleasant Valley Sunday"
 Written by Gerry Goffin and Carole King
 Lead vocal by Micky Dolenz
 Harmony vocals: Michael Nesmith
 Backing vocals: Davy Jones and Peter Tork
 Electric guitar: Michael Nesmith
 Acoustic guitar: Bill Chadwick (and, possibly, Micky Dolenz)
 Bass: Chip Douglas
 Drums: Eddie Hoh
 Shaker: Eddie Hoh
Congas: Eddie Hoh
 Electric piano: Peter Tork
 Released as a single before the album on July 10, 1967
 Reached number 3 on the pop charts
 Some accounts state that Micky Dolenz was present on the recording of the basic track and he probably played acoustic guitar on it.
 The stereo album version differs from the take released as a single, also heard on the mono album. The stereo and mono versions feature slightly different vocals by Micky on the opening verse (particularly obvious in the phrase "just came out to mow his lawn" — in the mono, the word "out" is heavily enunciated, while in the stereo version, it sounds more natural). Additionally, there are group backing vocals in the stereo version after Micky sings "hard for me to see" in the bridge; these are absent in the mono version. The distortion occurring on the fade of the stereo version also happens much more gradually than in mono. The musical takes may also be different.
 The fade on both released mixes is deliberately drowned in reverb and noise, but a karaoke mix released in 2004 features a conventional fade.
 First used in summer 1967 rebroadcast of the episodes "Case of The Missing Monkee" and "Captain Crocodile," then in the second-season episodes "The Picture Frame" and "Monkee Mayor."
 Recorded at RCA Victor Studios, Hollywood, June 10 and 11, 1967 after their Hollywood Bowl performance.

"Daily Nightly"
 Written by Michael Nesmith
 Lead vocal by Micky Dolenz
 Electric guitar: Michael Nesmith
 Bass: Chip Douglas
 Drums: Eddie Hoh
 Moog synthesizer: Micky Dolenz
 Organ: Peter Tork
 Percussion: Davy Jones
 Nesmith's inspiration for this song stemmed from the infamous Sunset Strip curfew riots and the misinformation that the media reported about the event; the event was first discussed by the boys in the epilogue interview segment of the episode "Find The Monkees."
 The mono and stereo mixes have slightly different Moog parts.
 Used in the episodes "Fairy Tale" and "The Monkees Blow Their Minds"
 Recorded at RCA Victor Studios, Hollywood, June 19 and August 1967

"Don't Call on Me"
 Written by Michael Nesmith and John London
 Lead vocal by Michael Nesmith
 Spoken words: Micky Dolenz and Davy Jones
 Electric guitar: Michael Nesmith
 Acoustic guitar: Chip Douglas
 Bass: Chip Douglas
 Drums: Eddie Hoh
 Claves: Eddie Hoh
 Piano: Robert Rafelson
 Organ: Peter Tork
 A reworked version of a pre-Monkees Nesmith song
 Recorded during two Hollywood sessions, not from "the elegant Pump Room (which closed in 2017) of the magnificent Palmer House (still in operation today), high over Chicago", which would not have been possible. The Pump Room restaurant and Palmer House Hotel are separate businesses located in two different areas of Chicago. The song begins with the sounds of a live audience in a lounge with dialogue between the boys, working into a jazzy, slow tune.
 Show producer Robert Rafelson played piano heard in the song's intro.
 Used in the episode "The Monkees in Paris"
 Recorded at RCA Victor Studios, Hollywood, June 20 and October 9, 1967, and RCA Victor Nashville Sound Studio, Nashville, August 1967

"Star Collector"
 Written by Gerry Goffin and Carole King
 Lead vocal by Davy Jones
 Harmony vocals: Micky Dolenz
 Backing vocals: Micky Dolenz, Davy Jones, Michael Nesmith (singing through the Moog synthesizer)
 Spoken words: Micky Dolenz
 Electric guitar: Michael Nesmith
 Bass: Chip Douglas
 Drums: Eddie Hoh
 Organ: Peter Tork
 Moog synthesizer: Paul Beaver
 Moog used on the album for a second time, this time played by Paul Beaver
 Song was about the growing phenomenon of groupies
 An alternate mix without Paul Beaver's Moog riffing was used on the TV show in the biker-themed episode "The Wild Monkees." A different version of this Moog-less mix is featured on Rhino Records' 2007 two-disc re-release of the album.
 Used in the episodes "The Wild Monkees", "Hitting the High Seas", "Monkees Watch Their Feet", "The Monkees in Paris", and "Monkees Mind Their Manor".
 The song features Micky Dolenz singing "bye bye" during the moog riff after the final verse, and again during the end.
 Recorded at RCA Victor Studios, Hollywood, June 22, 1967, and American Recorder, Studio City, October 4, 1967

1995 bonus tracks

"Special Announcement"
 Originally intended to be the kick-off to the album, it is a parody of the tape-alignment instructions for RCA studios.
 Spoken words by Peter Tork
 Sound effects: Steve Pitts, and Robert Rafelson
 The track features a dog barking at the end
 Recorded at RCA Victor Studios, October 9, 1967

"Goin' Down" (Extended Mono Mix)
 Written by Diane Hilderbrand, Peter Tork, Michael Nesmith, Micky Dolenz and David Jones
 Lead vocal by Micky Dolenz
 Electric guitar: Michael Nesmith
 Bass: Peter Tork
 Drums: Eddie Hoh
 Percussion: Davy Jones
 Trumpet: Bud Brisbois, Virgil Evans, Uan Rasey, Thomas Scott 
 Trombone: Louis Blackburn, Richard Leith, Richard Nash, Philip Teelee 
 Saxophone: William Collette, William Hood, Plas Johnson, John Lowe 
 Arrangement: Shorty Rogers
 B-side of "Daydream Believer"
 Intended to be on the album, but cut after including "Love Is Only Sleeping" on the album
 Inspired by Mose Allison and his song "Parchman Farm." It began as a free-form jam and then Michael decided it should be recorded as an original track.
 The mix presented here does not have a genuine fade-out, while appearances on compilations, and the '07 release do.
 The mix presented here is in mono, the jazzy riff is more restrained and muffled, the background hiss is more restrained, the trumpet wailing is less restrained, and a dialog is included at the end.
 The tempo on this mix is faster than on the single.
 Used in the series episodes "The Wild Monkees" "A Coffin Too Frequent" "The Monkees in Texas" "The Monstrous Monkee Mash" "The Monkees Paw" and "The Monkees in Paris". "The Wild Monkees" and "The Monkees in Texas" feature Micky singing live over the instrumental, while "The Monkees Paw" uses clips of just the instrumental track."
 Recorded at RCA Victor Studios, Hollywood, June 20, July 5 and September 15, 1967

Salesman (Alternate Mono Mix)
 Spoken words: Michael Nesmith
 Features Nesmith during the fade explaining how to make a joint using a cigarette rolling machine.

"The Door Into Summer" (Alternate Mono Mix)
 Features a different background vocal arrangement with a more prominent vocal by Micky, and an altered lead vocal by Mike. The drumming is also more restrained in this mix.

"Love Is Only Sleeping" (Early Mix)
 This is the original four-track mix before the song was transferred to eight-track tape for further overdubs; the four-track mix lacks the released mix's extensive echo effects and also features alternate organ parts, particularly on the ending.
 Recorded at RCA Victor Studios, Hollywood, June 19, 1967

"Daily Nightly" (Early Mix)
 Lacks Dolenz's synthesizer part
 Recorded at RCA Victor Studios, Hollywood, June 19, 1967

"Star Collector" (Extended Mix)
 Features a longer Moog solo and an altered beginning and ending.
 Is featured on Rhino Records' 2007 re-release of the album in both the longer Moog mix and also a Moog-less mix that features extensive backing vocals during the prolonged outro and fade.

Chart positions

Album

Single

Certifications

References

Works cited
 All information can be found in Rhino Records' reissues (1995 and 2007) of Pisces, Aquarius, Capricorn & Jones Ltd.
 The Monkees: The Day-By-Day Story of the 60s TV Pop Sensation by Andrew Sandoval

The Monkees albums
1967 albums
Arista Records albums
RCA Records albums
Rhino Records albums
Sundazed Records albums
Colgems Records albums
Psychedelic pop albums